Mystacomyia is a genus of flies in the family Tachinidae.

Species
M. rubriventris van der Wulp, 1890
M. scordala (Reinhard, 1955)

References

Exoristinae
Diptera of North America
Tachinidae genera
Taxa named by Ermanno Giglio-Tos